The Battle of Möckern was a series of heavy clashes between allied Prusso-Russian troops and Napoleonic French forces south of Möckern.  It occurred on 5 April 1813.  It ended in a French defeat and formed the successful prelude to the "Liberation War" against Napoleon (the German name for the German theatre of the War of the Sixth Coalition).

Context
In winter 1812, Napoleon had suffered a heavy defeat before Moscow upon which Prussia began to consider giving up its enforced alliance with the French.  It signed the Convention of Tauroggen with Russia on 30 December 1812, stipulating neutrality between them, and then on 27 March 1813 both powers declared war on France.

Course
Meanwhile, in March 1813, the Allied armies decided to attack French forces in Magdeburg so that they could then cross the River Elbe and advance westwards.  Troops were also sent off under the command of the Prussian generals Friedrich Wilhelm von Bülow, Karl Ludwig von Borstell, Friedrich von Hünerbein and Ludwig Yorck as well as the Russian commanders Peter Wittgenstein and Friedrich Wilhelm von Berg.  After the French received information of the advance, about 30,000 men left Magdeburg under viceroy Eugène on 2 April 1813 and crossed the Elbe, setting up his headquarters in Königsborn.  Wittgenstein, who was in overall command of the Allied operations, planned to use feints further to the east to draw in the French and then cut them off after they returned to Magdeburg.

In expectation of an attack, the French formed their troops along the river Ehle between Möckern and Gommern.  The allies arranged a total of about 10,000 men in three detachments marching in from the northeast, east and southeast.  Smaller clashes were already happening on the 3rd and 4 April, with the French committing few troops to the fighting.  Messages also began to arrive stating that the French wished to withdraw to Magdeburg and so Wittgenstein gave the command to attack on 5 April.

First general Hünerbein with two Yorkschen Corps marching in from the south came upon the French near Dannigkow, leading to stubborn resistance and house-to-house fighting.

In spite of numerical inferiority, after four hours Hünerbein succeeded in forcing the 2,000 French soldiers out of their positions.

The second major clash happened at the Ehle river crossing in Vehlitz.  Prusso-Russian troops under Borstel and Berg here attacked the French, who had posted themselves in several lines at the Ehle as far as behind Vehlitz.  Due to the deep gradient, few of the Allied guns could come to bear and so the battle descended into man-to-man fighting.  This was impeded wide swampy area that lay between the two forces, meaning the soldiers had to wade across in places with the water up to breast height.  After violent clashes, in which the French also used cavalry squadrons, here too the Allies succeeded in forcing the French from their positions.

Result
In view of these unexpected defeats, the French viceroy concluded on the night of 5 April to withdraw once more to Magdeburg.  On its withdrawal the French forces destroyed all the bridges of the Klusdammes, denying the most important access routes to Magdeburg to the Allies.  Although the French forces in Germany were not finally defeated by this action, for the Prussians and Russians the clash was nevertheless a first important success on the way to the final victory over Napoleon.

Gallery

Notes

References
 Sequence

External links
 

Mockern
Mockern
Möckern
1813 in Europe
April 1813 events
Mockern